Sir Ralph Mark Halpern (24 October 1938 – 10 August 2022) was a British businessman, who was the founder of Topshop and chief executive officer (CEO) of the Burton Group from 1979 to 1991.

Early life
Ralph Halpern was born in October 1938 in London, after his Jewish parents fled from the Nazis in the 1930s and emigrated to England, losing their fortune.

Career
Halpern joined Burton Group as a management trainee in 1961, and was directly involved in the establishment of Top Shop (above a Peter Robinson branch) in 1964. On the back of its success he progressed through the managerial ranks becoming chief executive in 1978. He turned it into a retail empire that dominated the British high street, with 2,800 stores and employing more than 60,000 people. With brands including Topshop, Dorothy Perkins, Debenhams, Principles, Racing Green and Evans, it was worth £1.8bn when Halpern  was ousted by the board in 1991.

Personal life and death
Halpern was knighted for "services to the retail industry" in the 1986 Birthday Honours. He married Joan Donkin in 1967. They had a daughter, Jenny Halpern Prince, and divorced in 1999. In 1987, he was linked by the British tabloids to a liaison with the page 3 model Fiona Wright, leading to a "five times a night" headline.

In 2000, Halpern became a father again, aged 61, when his second wife and former secretary, Laura Blume, gave birth to a son. He and Laura were subsequently divorced in Miami in 2007. He was still residing in Miami in 2019.

Halpern died on 10 August 2022, at the age of 83.

References

1938 births
2022 deaths
Austrian emigrants to the United Kingdom
Austrian Jews
British Jews
British chief executives
British people of Austrian-Jewish descent
Businesspeople from London
Knights Bachelor